"Sophisticated Lady (She's a Different Lady)" is a 1976 R&B/Soul song recorded by American singer Natalie Cole issued as lead single from her second album Natalie. The song won Cole a second consecutive Grammy Award for Best Female R&B Vocal Performance.

Background
"Sophisticated Lady" provided Cole with a Top Ten hit in both Italy and New Zealand with respective peaks of #8 and #4; "Sophisticated Lady..." would remain Cole's only Top 20 hit in Italy and also her highest charting single in New Zealand although in 1988 "Pink Cadillac" would also reach #4 NZ.

Chart positions
It spent one week at #1 on the Hot Soul Singles charts in 1976, and was  Cole's third consecutive #1 soul hit.  "Sophisticated Lady..." would not be one of Cole's biggest US Pop hits, rising no higher than #25 on the Billboard Hot 100;

References

External links
[ Song review] on AllMusic

1976 singles
Natalie Cole songs
Songs written by Marvin Yancy